Malakoff Independent School District is a public school district based in Malakoff, Texas (USA).

In addition to Malakoff, the district serves the cities of Star Harbor, most of the cities of Caney City and Tool, and small portions of Trinidad, Log Cabin, and Athens.

In 2009, the school district was rated "exemplary" by the Texas Education Agency.

Schools
Malakoff High (Grades 9-12)
Malakoff Middle (Grades 6-8)
Malakoff Elementary (Grades PK-5)
Tool Elementary (Grades PK-5)

References

External links
Malakoff ISD

School districts in Henderson County, Texas